The 2016 United States House of Representatives elections in New Jersey were held on November 8, 2016, to elect the 12 U.S. representatives from the state of New Jersey, one from each of the state's 12 congressional districts. The elections coincided with the 2016 U.S. presidential election, as well as other elections to the House of Representatives, elections to the United States Senate and various state and local elections. The primaries were held on June 7.

District 1

Democratic Party incumbent Donald Norcross was first elected to this seat in the 2014 election.

Democratic primary

Candidates

Nominee
 Donald Norcross, incumbent U.S. Representative

Eliminated in primary
 Alex Law

Results

Republican primary

Candidates

Nominee
 Bob Patterson, senior speechwriter in the George W. Bush's administration and adjunct professor of government at Patrick Henry College

Results

General election

Endorsements

Results

District 2

Republican Frank LoBiondo has represented this district since 1995.

Republican primary

Candidates

Nominee
 Frank LoBiondo, incumbent U.S. Representative

Results

Democratic primary

Candidates

Nominee
 David Cole, former White House aide, Barack Obama campaign staffer and candidate for this seat in 2014

Eliminated in primary
 Constantino "Tino" Rozzo

Results

General election

Endorsements

Polling

Results

District 3

Republican Tom MacArthur had represented this district since 2015.

Republican primary

Candidates

Nominee
 Tom MacArthur, incumbent U.S. Representative

Results

Democratic primary

Candidates

Nominee
 Fred LaVergne, activist

Eliminated in primary
 Jim Keady, activist and educator

Results

General election

Results

District 4

Republican Chris Smith has represented this district since 1981.

Republican primary

Candidates

Nominee
 Chris Smith, incumbent U.S. Representative

Eliminated in primary
 Bruce C MacDonald, jewellery store owner

Results

Democratic primary

Candidates

Nominee
 Lorna Phillipson, candidate for the General Assembly in 2015

Results

General election

Endorsements

Results

District 5

Republican incumbent Scott Garrett had served for seven terms. Josh Gottheimer, a former speechwriter for Bill Clinton and aide for the 2004 presidential campaign of John Kerry and the 2008 presidential campaign of Hillary Clinton, ran against Garrett as a Democrat.

Republican primary

Candidates

Nominee
 Scott Garrett, incumbent U.S. Representative

Eliminated in primary
 Michael Cino, oil executive and candidate for this seat in 2006 & 2012
 Peter Vallorosi

Results

Democratic primary

Candidates

Nominee
 Josh Gottheimer, former senior counselor to the chair of the FCC and speechwriter for Bill Clinton

Results

General election

Endorsements

Predictions

Results

District 6

Democratic Frank Pallone has represented this district since 1989.

Democratic primary

Candidates

Nominee
 Frank Pallone, incumbent U.S. Representative

Results

Republican primary

Candidates

Nominee
 Brent Sonnek-Schmelz

Results

General election

Endorsements

Results

District 7

Republican Leonard Lance has represented this district since 2009.

Republican primary

Candidates

Nominee
 Leonard Lance, incumbent U.S. Representative

Eliminated in primary
 David Larsen, small-business owner
 Craig P. Heard

Results

Democratic primary

Candidates

Nominee
 Peter Jacob, social worker

Results

General election

Endorsements

Results

District 8

Democrat Albio Sires has represented this district since 2007.

Democratic primary

Candidates

Nominee
 Albio Sires, incumbent U.S. Representative

Eliminated in primary
 Eloy J. Delgado

Results

Republican primary

Candidates

Nominee
 Agha Khan

Results

General election

Endorsements

Results

District 9

Democratic Bill Pascrell has represented this district since 1997.

Democratic primary

Candidates

Nominee
 Bill Pascrell, incumbent U.S. Representative

Withdrew
 Jeff Jones, former Paterson mayor

Results

Republican primary

Candidates

Nominee
 Hector L. Castillo, physician and independent candidate for governor in 2005

Results

General election

Endorsements

Results

District 10

Democratic Donald Payne Jr. has represented this district since 2013.

Democratic primary

Candidates

Nominee
 Donald Payne Jr., incumbent U.S. Representative

Results

Republican primary

Candidates

Nominee
 David H. Pinckney

Results

General election

Endorsements

Results

District 11

Republican Rodney Frelinghuysen has represented this district since 1995.

Republican primary

Candidates

Nominee
 Rodney Frelinghuysen, incumbent U.S. Representative

Eliminated in primary
 Rick Van Glahn, home improvement contractor and candidate for this seat in 2014

Results

Democratic primary

Candidates

Nominee
 Joseph M. Wenzel

Eliminated in primary
 Lee Anne Brogowski, business analyst and candidate for this seat in 2014
 Richard McFarlane

Results

General election

Endorsements

Results

District 12

Democrat Bonnie Watson Coleman has represented this district since 2015.

Democratic primary

Candidates

Nominee
 Bonnie Watson Coleman, incumbent U.S. Representative

Eliminated in primary
 Alexander J. Kucsma

Results

Republican primary

Candidates

Nominee
 Steven J. Uccio

Results

General election

Endorsements

Results

References

External links
U.S. House elections in New Jersey, 2016 at Ballotpedia
Campaign contributions at OpenSecrets

House
New Jersey
2016